Nicolas Pierre Loir (1624, Paris – 1679, Paris), was a French painter and engraver of religious and historical allegories.

Biography
According to the RKD he was a pupil of Sébastien Bourdon and Simon Vouet, who later became a follower of Nicolas Poussin. He travelled to Italy in the years 1647–1649, and in 1650 was back in Paris. In 1669 his pupil François de Troy married his sister-in-law, Jeanne Cotelle. Roger de Piles included him in his list of notable French artists, noting that he was the son of a goldsmith and a very good draughtsman.

References

Cornelis de Bie wrote a commemorative poem to his art on page 491 of his book Het Gulden Cabinet
Nicolas Pierre Loir on Artnet

1624 births
1679 deaths
17th-century French engravers
17th-century French painters
French male painters
Painters from Paris